Uno Piir (born 12 November 1929) is an Estonian football coach and former player. He was the first manager of the Estonia national football team after the Soviet occupation. In 1997, together with Anton Siht and Värner Lootsmann, he re-established the Nõmme Kalju football club and coached it until 2004.

Honours

Player
Dünamo Tallinn
 Estonian SSR Football Championship: 1949, 1950
 Estonian Cup: 1949

Kalev Tallinn
 Estonian SSR Football Championship: 1955

Manager
Norma Tallinn
 Estonian SSR Football Championship: 1964, 1967, 1970, 1979, 1988
 Estonian Cup: 1962, 1965, 1971, 1973, 1974 ja 1989

Tallinna Sadam
 Estonian Cup: 1995–96

References

1929 births
Living people
Footballers from Tallinn
Estonian football managers
Estonian footballers
Soviet footballers
Soviet football managers
JK Tallinna Kalev players
Nõmme Kalju FC managers
Estonia national football team managers
Association football midfielders